Ellsler is a surname. Notable people with the name include:

Effie Ellsler (1855–1942), American actress, daughter of John
John A. Ellsler (1821–1903), American actor, theatre manager, and acting instructor

See also
Elssler